Hawks of Outremer is a collection of historical short stories by Robert E. Howard.  It was first published in 1979 by Donald M. Grant, Publisher, Inc. in an edition of 1,625 copies.  The stories feature Howard's character Cormac Fitzgeoffrey and was edited by Richard L. Tierney. "Outremer" (literally, "Oversea") was how the Crusader states were often called; Fitzgeoffrey is depicted as a participant in the Third Crusade.

Contents
 "Hawks of Outremer"
 "The Blood of Belshazzar"
 "The Slave-Princess" (completed by Richard L. Tierney)

References

1979 short story collections
Short story collections by Robert E. Howard
Donald M. Grant, Publisher books